Insomniac's Dream is the first EP by American rock band Adema, and was released on November 5, 2002 after their self-titled debut album. Only the first three tracks are new, though "Shattered" was released on some international versions of Adema and "Nutshell" is a cover of an Alice in Chains song. "Immortal" was the theme song for Mortal Kombat: Deadly Alliance, and is the only song to have had a music video.

Track listing

Credits
Adema
 Mark Chavez — vocals, executive producer
 Tim Fluckey — guitar
 Mike Ransom — guitar
 Dave DeRoo — bass
 Kris Kohls — drums

Additional musicians
 Fran Cathcart 	—	guitar, engineer
 Sam "Sever" Citrin 	—	drums, engineer, mixing, effects, remixing, producer

Production
 Josh Surratt   - 	Mixing
 Richard Mouser -	Mixing
 Brian Reeves 	 -	Mixing
 L.A. Reid 	 -	Executive producer
 Richie Zito 	 -	Producer
 Jeffrey Schulz -	Art direction, design
 Chris Vrenna 	 -	Producer, remixing, mixing
 David Dominguez -	Engineer
 Joshua Sarubin  -	A&R
 Patrick Shevelin -	Engineer, Pro-Tools
 Annamaria DiSanto -	Photography
 Tim Harkins     -	Assistant engineer
 Brian Nolan     -	Photography
 Tobias Miller   -	Producer, engineer
 Adema 	  -	Producer
 Bill Appleberry -	Producer, engineer
 Mike Fraser 	  -	Mixing
 David J. Holman -	Mixing

Charts

References 

Adema albums
2002 EPs
Arista Records EPs